William Mariner  (29 May 1882 – 1 July 1916) was an English recipient of the Victoria Cross, the highest and most prestigious award for gallantry in the face of the enemy that can be awarded to British and Commonwealth forces.

Details
Mariner, the son of Mrs A. Wignall was 32 years old, and a private in the 2nd Battalion, The King's Royal Rifle Corps, British Army during the First World War when the following deed took place for which he was awarded the VC.

The citation for the award, published in the London Gazette on 23 June 1915, read:

Death
William Mariner was killed on the evening of 30 June 1916 or the early morning of 1 July 1916 during a large scale raid in the Railway Triangle, south of Loos. This raid was a diversionary attack on the eve of the Somme offensive. His death was witnessed by Giles E. M. Eyre and others who wrote "that Mariner seemed to lose control during a heavy bombardment, ran down an enemy trench and was last seen bayoneting a German as a shell exploded on him, blowing him to pieces."

References

Monuments to Courage (David Harvey, 1999)
The Register of the Victoria Cross (This England, 1997)
VCs of the First World War - The Western Front 1915 (Peter F. Batchelor & Christopher Matson, 1999)

External links
VC sold
The Convict VC
VC located
Chorley Memorial
KRRC Association

1882 births
1916 deaths
People from Chorley
British World War I recipients of the Victoria Cross
King's Royal Rifle Corps soldiers
British Army personnel of World War I
British military personnel killed in the Battle of the Somme
British Army recipients of the Victoria Cross
Military personnel from Lancashire